A by-election was held for the New South Wales Legislative Assembly seat of Randwick on 14 February 1970. It was triggered by the resignation of sitting member Lionel Bowen to successfully contest the federal seat of Kingsford Smith at the 1969 election.

Dates

Result 

Lionel Bowen resigned to successfully contest the 1969 election for Kingsford Smith.

See also
Electoral results for the district of Randwick
List of New South Wales state by-elections

References 

1970 elections in Australia
New South Wales state by-elections
1970s in New South Wales
February 1970 events in Australia